The Canadian Journal of Mathematics is a bimonthly mathematics journal published by the Canadian Mathematical Society.

It was established in 1949 by H. S. M. Coxeter and G. de B. Robinson. The current editors-in-chief of the journal are Louigi Addario-Berry and Eyal Goren. 
The journal publishes articles in all areas of mathematics.

See also

 Canadian Mathematical Bulletin

References

External links 
 

University of Toronto Press academic journals
Mathematics journals
Publications established in 1949
Bimonthly journals
Multilingual journals
Cambridge University Press academic journals
Academic journals associated with learned and professional societies of Canada